Phengite is a series name for dioctahedral micas of composition K(AlMg)2(OH)2(SiAl)4O10 it is common for Mg or Fe2+ to substitute for Al on the Y site and a corresponding increase in Si on the Z site in the mica group formula X2Y4–6Z8O20(OH, F)4. Similar to muscovite but with addition of magnesium. It is a non-IMA recognized mineral name representing the series between muscovite and celadonite.

The silica content of phengite has been proposed as a geobarometer for the metamorphism of low grade schists.

References

 Glossary of Geology, Fifth Edition, Eds. K.K.E. Neiendorf, J.P. Mehl, J.A. Jackson, American Geological Institute, 2005
 von Kobell, Franz (1853) Tafeln zur Bestimmung des Mineralien, 5th edition, Munchen.
 Guidotti, Charles V. (1984) Micas in metamorphic Rocks, reviews in Mineralogy, 13: 357-467.
 Rieder et al. (1998): Nomenclature of the micas. Canadian Mineralogist 36: 905-912.
 Mookherjee, M., and Redfern, S.A.T. (2002) A high-pressure Fourier-transform infrared study of the interlayer and Si-O stretching region in phengite-2M 1. Clay Minerals: 37: 323-336.
 Cibin, G., G. Cinque, A. Marcelli, A. Mottana, & R. Sassi (2008): The octahedral sheet of metamorphic 2M1-phengites: a combined EMPA and AXANES study: American Mineralogist 93, 414-425.

Mica group